This list of exoplanets discovered in 2021 is a list of confirmed exoplanets that were first observed in 2021.
For exoplanets detected only by radial velocity, the listed value for mass is a lower limit. See Minimum mass for more information.

Specific exoplanet lists

References 

2021

exoplanets